Paul is the surname of:

Surname

 Aaron Paul (born 1979), American actor
 Adrian Paul (born 1959), English actor
 Aislinn Paul (born 1994), Canadian actress
 Alexandra Paul (born 1963), American actress
 Alice Paul (1885–1977), American suffragist leader, feminist and women's rights activist
Aloke Paul (born 1973), Indian scientist
 Amala Paul (born 1991), Indian film actress in Tamil and Malayalam cinema
 Andrus Paul (born 1975), Estonian luger
 Anindita Paul, Indian singer
 Annamie Paul (born 1972), Canadian politician, activist and lawyer, sister of Ngozi Paul
 Art Paul, American graphic designer
 Beena Paul (born 1961), Indian film editor in Malayalam
 Bruno Paul, German architect, interior designer, and furniture designer
 Chris Paul (born 1985), American basketball player
 Chris Paul (American football) (born 1998), American football player
 Christi Paul, American news anchor for CNN Headline News
 David L. Paul (1939–2022), American banker and real estate developer
 Doreen Paul (born 1962), Dominican banker and politician
 Ellis Paul (born 1965), American singer-songwriter and folk musician
 Hamilton Paul (1773–1854), Scottish Presbyterian minister and writer 
 Harry Paul (1886–1948), Scottish footballer
 Henri Paul, driver of the car in which he, Princess Diana, and Dodi Fayed were killed
 Herieth Paul, Tanzanian-Canadian fashion model
 Jacob Paul (born 1995), British hurdler
 Jai Paul, British recording artist
 Jake Paul (born 1997), American actor and YouTube personality
 Jay Paul, American billionaire Silicon Valley real estate investor
 James Balfour Paul (1846–1931), the Lord Lyon King of Arms, the officer responsible for heraldry in Scotland
 Jayson Paul (born 1984), birth name of JTG, American professional wrestler
 Jean Paul (cricketer) (born 1985), West Indian cricketer
 John Paul (disambiguation), several people
 John Paul Jones (1747–1792), Scottish-American Naval captain 
 Josh Paul (born 1975), American baseball player and coach
 Joyce Paul (1937–2016), American country music singer
 Leah Paul (born 1999), Irish cricketer
 Lee Paul (1939–2019), American film and television actor
 Les Paul (1915–2009), American guitarist
 Logan Paul (born 1995), American actor and Internet personality
 Manish Paul (born 1981), Indian actor, comedian, anchor, TV show host
 Markus Paul (1966–2020), American football coach and player
 Matthias Paul (actor) (born 1964), German actor
 Matthias Paul (DJ) (born 1971), German DJ, producer and musician known as Paul van Dyk
 Mihai Paul (born 1982), Romanian basketball player
 Ngozi Paul, Canadian screen actress, writer, director and producer; younger sister of Annamie Paul
 Nick Paul (born 1995), Canadian ice hockey player
 Peter Paul (disambiguation), several people
 Rand Paul (born 1963), American ophthalmologist and politician
 Richard Paul (actor) (1940–1998), American actor
 Ron Paul (born 1935), American physician and US Representative; father of Rand
 Saju Paul (born 1966), Indian politician
 Satya Paul, Indian fashion designer
 Shermar Paul (born 1997), Canadian rapper, songwriter and record producer known professionally as Night Lovell
 Sohini Paul (born 1986), Bengali actress, daughter of Tapas Paul
 Tapas Paul (1958–2020), Indian Bengali actor and politician 
 Thomas Paul (footballer) (b. 1961), Swiss footballer 
 Thomas Paul (minister) (1773–1831), Baptist minister who became the first pastor for the First African Baptist Church
 Thomas Paul (priest), 18th century Irish Anglican priest
 Tom Paul (politician) (1874–1964), New Zealand compositor, trade unionist, politician, editor, journalist and censor
 Tom Paul (footballer) (1933–2015), English footballer
 Tommy Paul (1909–1991), American boxer
 Tommy Paul (tennis) (born 1997), American tennis player
 Willie Paul (footballer) (1866–1911), Scottish footballer

Pen name or stage name
 Billy Paul, stage name of American soul singer Paul Williams (1934–2016)
 Jean Paul, pen name of Johann Paul Friedrich Richter (1763–1825), German Romantic writer
 Thomas Paul (bass) (b. 1934), American bass and voice teacher
 Vinnie Paul, drummer for American Metal band Pantera

See also
 Paul (given name)
 Paul (disambiguation)
 Jay Paul Company, real estate development company based in Northern California
 Lynsey de Paul, English singer-songwriter
 Vincent de Paul (1581–1660), French Catholic saint
 Pal (surname), a common surname in India and Bangladesh

English-language surnames
Surnames from given names
Surnames of Haitian origin